The government of Afghanistan, officially called the Islamic Emirate of Afghanistan, is the central government of Afghanistan, a unitary state. Under the leadership of the Taliban, the government is a theocracy and an emirate with political power concentrated in the hands of a supreme leader and his clerical advisors, collectively referred to as the Leadership. The Leadership makes all major policy decisions behind closed doors, which are then implemented by the country's civil service and judiciary. As Afghanistan is an Islamic state, governance is based on Sharia, which the Taliban enforces strictly through extensive social and cultural policy.

Over its history, Afghanistan has variously been governed as a monarchy, a republic, and a theocracy. The current theocratic government came to power in 2021 with the Taliban's victory in a twenty-year insurgency against the western-backed Islamic Republic, after having itself been ousted in 2001.

The current government is internationally unrecognized and lacks a clear constitutional basis, though the Taliban has announced plans to form a constitutional commission in the near future. Instead, the government applies an arbitrary interpretation of Sharia. There is no separation of powers, with total authority vested in the Leadership. The government is criticized by international observers for totalitarianism, systemic human rights violations, as well as for being unaccountable, opaque, and exclusive of women, religious and ethnic minorities, and those with dissenting views. Since coming to power, it has grappled with an economic crisis, international isolation, terrorism and rebellion, and a string of natural disasters.

Leadership of the Islamic Emirate

Supreme Leader 

The supreme leader of the Islamic Emirate of Afghanistan is the head-of-state, commander-in-chief, and religious leader of Afghanistan. These responsibilities include appointing and dismissing the cabinet, judiciary, armed forces general staff, and provincial and municipal governments, issuing decrees, special instructions, and orders regulating the operations of those mentioned above. The supreme leader also approves or vetos laws drafted by cabinet ministries, after they are vetted by the Ministry of Justice and a review committee for compliance with Islamic law. Supreme leaders have all served life terms, with their deputies appointed by the Leadership Council to succeed them. 

The supreme leader is advised by an advisory council of four to six individuals on appointments, national security, and domestic and religious policy, which form an advisory committee. These individuals have the final say on all policy decisions.

Deputy Leader(s) 

The deputy leader(s) of the Islamic Emirate of Afghanistan is the deputy head-of-state and is appointed by the supreme leader for an indefinite term. The deputy leader serves as acting top leader when the former is incapacitated or otherwise unavailable to execute their duties. However, there can be more than two deputy leaders, as was the case with Akhtar Mansoor promoting Haibatullah Akhundzada and Sirajuddin Haqqani to the positions. By norm, the first deputy leader succeeds the supreme leader upon death.

Ulema Council of Kandahar 
The Ulema Council of Kandahar, or Kandahar Provincial Council, is the de facto ruling and executive oversight body of the Islamic Emirate of Afghanistan. Despite being officially responsible for advising and overseeing the Kandahar provincial government, it also approves and disapproves all decisions made by the Kabul-based Council of Ministers. 

All its members are ulema native to or residents of Kandahar province. The supreme leader appoints all 24 members, with the council itself is presided over by a chairman and deputy chairman and being assisted by a financial and administrative director.

Council of Ulema (national) 
The Council of Ulema or Ulema Shura is the highest religious authority in Afghanistan. It is responsible for ensuring all policies by the executive conform to Sharia and can overrule decisions made by the Council of Ministers. Other responsibilities include the appointment, removal or replacement, and giving of allegiance, to the Supreme Leader.

Central Dar ul-Ifta 
The Central Dar ul-Ifta is responsible for issuing fatwas on various issues. It functions as a religious judicial body, allowed to make quasi-binding decisions on multiple topics its scholars deem to be in line with Islamic Law. Its director is appointed and dismissed by the supreme leader.

Executive

Prime Minister 

The prime minister of the Islamic Emirate of Afghanistan is the appointed head of government. They are responsible for overseeing the civil service operations and presiding over the Council of Ministers. The prime minister's office is one of six institutions within the cabinet that are directly under the purview of the supreme leader. 

The prime minister, along with the cabinet, is appointed and dismissed by the supreme leader for an undefined term.

Deputy Prime Ministers 
The deputy prime ministers of the Islamic Emirate of Afghanistan are the appointed deputy heads of government, responsible for presiding over the civil service and Council of Ministers in the prime minister's absence or incapacity. Deputy prime ministers are also assigned specialized portfolios since 2021, overseeing technical commissions addressing critical issues. 

Like the prime minister and cabinet, the deputy prime ministers are appointed and dismissed by the supreme leader for an undefined term.

Council of Ministers 

The council of ministers of the Islamic Emirate of Afghanistan is the cabinet. It comprises 26 ministries whose agency executives administer the civil service and are overseen by the Prime Minister. The ministries are also responsible for preparing legislation in their respective areas of policy for vetting by the Ministry of Justice and approval or veto by the supreme leader. Despite being led by the prime minister, it's effectively answerable and subordinate to the Supreme Leader. 
 Office of the Prime Minister
 Office of the Deputy Prime Minister for Economic Affairs
 Office of the Deputy Prime Minister for Administrative Affairs
 Office of the Deputy Prime Minister for Political Affairs
 Ministry of Defence
 Ministry of Interior Affairs
 Ministry of Finance
 Ministry of Education
 Ministry of Information and Culture
 Ministry of Economy
 Ministry of Hajj and Religious Affairs
 Ministry of Justice
 Ministry of Borders and Tribal Affairs
 Ministry of Rural Rehabilitation and Development
 Ministry of Preaching and Guidance, Propagation of Virtue and Prevention of Evil
 Ministry of Public Health
 Ministry of Commerce and Industry
 Ministry of Public Works
 Ministry of Mines and Petroleum 
 Ministry of Water and Power
 Ministry of Aviation and Transport
 Minister of Higher Education
 Ministry of Communications and Information Technology
 Ministry of Refugees and Repatriation 
 Ministry of Agriculture, Irrigation, and Livestock

Commissions 
Several commissions have been formed to handle issues and subjects seen as critical by the Islamic Emirate. Several cabinet ministers or ministry directors are appointed to chair these commissions. There are currently several commissions that have been formed since August 15, 2021. 
 Economic Commission
 Administrative Commission
 Repatriation and Contact of Afghan Personalities Commission
 Security and Settlement Affairs Commission
 Declaration and Liquidation Commission
 Media Violations Commission
 Aid Submission Commission
 Political Commission
 National Procurement Commission

Judiciary 

The judiciary of the Islamic Emirate of Afghanistan is the judicial system. It consists of the Supreme Court, Appellate Courts, Civil Courts, and Primary Courts. All justices and court officials are appointed and dismissed by the Supreme Leader.

Supreme Court 

The supreme court of the Islamic Emirate of Afghanistan is the court of final resort and oversees the judiciary. Currently, the court comprises a chief justice and two deputy justices. In the first round of judicial appointments after the Fall of Kabul, the supreme court appointed all judges.

Appellate Court(s) 
The appellate courts are the courts of second appeal operating at the provincial level. Each court is presided over by an appointed Chief Justice and assisted by a court clerk in administration alongside a mufti. Cases are heard from Primary Courts.

Primary Court(s) 
Primary courts are the courts of the first instance, operating at the district level. Like the Appellate Courts, Primary Courts are presided over by an appointed chief justice presides over the court and are assisted by a clerk in administration alongside a mufti.

Military judiciary 

The Islamic Emirate of Afghanistan also maintains a parallel military judicial system meant for hearing complaints, lawsuits, and petitions against personnel within the security forces. It consists of the Military Court, zonal Military Courts, and provincial Military Courts.

Military Court 
The military court of the Islamic Emirate of Afghanistan is the court of final resort for the hearing of complaints, lawsuits, and petitions against  personnel from the Ministry of Defence, Ministry of Interior Affairs, and General Directorate of Intelligence. The court is presided over by an appointed Head of the Military Court who is assisted by two justices. Mawlawi Obaidullah Nizami is the current Head of the Military Court, and presides over the court alongside Mawlawi Sayyid Agha, and Mawlawi Zahid Akhundzada.

Zonal military courts 
Eight military courts serve as a court of the second instance for complaints, petitions, and lawsuits, involving personnel within the areas security forces from the Ministry of Defence, Ministry of Interior Affairs, and General Directorate of Intelligence. These courts are led by an appointed 'executive commander' while judicial hearings are presided over by an appointed justice. Zonal military counters operate above provincial military courts.

Provincial military courts 
Provincial military courts are courts of the first instance for complaints, lawsuits, and petitions security personnel at the provincial level. All cases are presided over by an appointed justice, which would be heard by the respective zonal military court if approved.

Provincial governments

Provincial Ulema Council 
The supreme leader appoints a provincial Ulema Councils, also known as the Council of Scholars, to oversee the governor and civil service. The council is given the power to advise the provincial government and overrule any policy or decision contrary to Islam. 

Each council comprises 15 to 24 appointed religious scholars and tribal elders. An appointed chairman presides over the body, while a deputy chairman and financial and administrative director assist him.

Provincial governor 
The provincial governor is appointed and dismissed by the supreme leader to oversee the province's administration under the regional ulema council. All governors supervise the work of local civil service and can issue instructions regulating or directing their work.

Provincial departments 
Beneath the provincial governor is departments that manage the local civil service. These departments are regional directorates of ministries within the council of ministers. Directors appointed and dismissed by the supreme leader oversee the operation of their respective local departments. These departments at the provincial level are:
 Governor's Office
 Finance Department
 Education Department
 Agriculture, Livestock, and Irrigation Department
 Information and Culture Department
 Hajj and Religious Affairs Department
 Rural Rehabilitation and Development Department
 Preaching and Guidance, Propagation of Virtue and Prevention of Evil Department
 Public Works Department
 Refugee and Repatriation Department
 Intelligence Department

Security forces 

Internal and external security of the Islamic Emirate of Afghanistan are the responsibility of the Ministry of Interior Affairs and Ministry of Defence respectively. The heads of these two respective ministries are Mohammed Yaqoob, head of the Military Affairs Commission within the Rahbari Shura and son of Mullah Omar, and Sirajuddin Haqqani, head of the Haqqani Network.

Currently the Islamic Emirate Army is subdivided into eight corps, mostly superseding the previous corps of the Afghan National Army. In November 2021 Mullah Yaqoob, Acting Minister of Defense, announced the new names and of the corps.

See also
Recognition of the Islamic Emirate of Afghanistan

References

 
Taliban
Islamic Emirate of Afghanistan
Asian governments